Afrasiab ( afrāsiyāb;  ; Middle-Persian: Frāsiyāv, Frāsiyāk) is the name of the mythical king and hero of Turan. He is the main antagonist of the Persian epic Shahnameh, written by Ferdowsi.

The mythical king and hero

According to the Shahnameh (Book of Kings), by the Persian epic poet Ferdowsi, Afrasiab was the king and hero of Turan and an archenemy of Iran. In Iranian mythology, Afrasiab is considered by far the most prominent of all Turanian kings; he is a formidable warrior, a skilful general, and an agent of Ahriman, who is endowed with magical powers of deception to destroy Iranian civilization. He is brother to Garsivaz, and the son of Pashang.

According to Islamic sources, Afrasiab was a descendant of Tūr (Avestan: Tūriya-), one of the three sons of the Iranian mythical King Fereydun (the other two sons being Salm and Iraj). In Bundahishn, he is named as the seventh grandson of Tūr. In Avestan traditions, his common epithet mairya- (deceitful, villainous) can  be interpreted as meaning 'an evil man'. He lived in a subterranean fortress made of metal, called Hanakana.

According to Avestan sources, Afrasiab was killed by Haoma near the Čīčhast (possibly either referring to Lake Hamun in Sistan or some unknown lake in today's Central Asia), and according to Shahnameh he met his death in a cave known as the Hang-e Afrasiab, or the dying place of Afrasiab, on a mountaintop in Azerbaijan. The fugitive Afrasiab, having been repeatedly defeated by the armies of his adversary, the mythical King of Iran Kay Khosrow (who happened to be his own grandson, through his daughter Farangis), wandered wretchedly and fearfully around, and eventually took refuge in this cave and died.

Hypotheses 
Ernst Hertzfeld believed that the name Parsondes is etymologically identical to the name Afrasiab. Tabari in his works mentions the derivative Afrasiab / Aspandiat under the name of the Hephtalite king Akhshunvar or Akhshunvaz.

See also 
 Afrasiyab (Samarkand)
 Afrasiab Museum of Samarkand
 Alp Er Tunga

References

External links
 Ehsan Yarshater, "Afrāsiāb", Encyclopædia Iranica
 Afrasiab featured in Rostam Comic Book
 The battle of Rustam and Afrasiab on Asian miniature

Shahnameh characters